American actress and singer Jennifer Love Hewitt has released four studio albums, a compilation album, seven music videos, and thirteen singles, as well as five promotional singles. Hewitt moved to Los Angeles at the age of 10 to pursue a music career; she instead rose to prominence as an actress in television commercials and on the children's television series Kids Incorporated. In 1990, Hewitt released a stand-alone cover of Blondie's "Heart of Glass" and appeared with Earth, Wind & Fire on a compilation album, Music Speaks Louder Than Words. While she continued to act, Hewitt signed a recording contract with video game company Meldac. She released her debut studio album, Love Songs, under the name "Love Hewitt" in March 1992; it included three singles: "Dancing Queen", "What's It Gonna Take", and "Please Save Us the World".

Hewitt received further attention in 1994 for her performance in the family drama Party of Five. During this success, she signed with Atlantic and released two studio albums: Let's Go Bang in September 1995 and a self-titled album in September 1996. To promote Let's Go Bang, the title track and "Couldn't Find Another Man" were marketed as singles. "Cool with You", "No Ordinary Love", and "I Believe In..." were released as singles from her self-titled album. Both albums were commercially unsuccessful, which resulted in Hewitt's being dropped from Atlantic; after this, she focused on her acting career. 

Hewitt recorded the single "How Do I Deal" for the soundtrack of the 1998 slasher film I Still Know What You Did Last Summer, in which she had a starring role. The song reached number 59 on the Billboard Hot 100, as well as number 8 on the Australian songs chart and number 5 on the New Zealand songs chart. It received a gold certification from the Australian Recording Industry Association (ARIA) and is the best-selling song of her career.

In October 2002, Hewitt released her fourth studio album, BareNaked. It peaked at number 37 on the Billboard 200, number 31 on the Australian albums chart, number 75 on the German albums chart, and number 72 on the Dutch albums chart. Two singles were released from the album: "BareNaked" and "Can I Go Now"; both charted in the United States and internationally, and each received a gold certification from the ARIA. "Hey Everybody" was the only promotional single from the album. The same year, Hewitt recorded "I'm Gonna Love You (Madellaine's Love Song)" for the film The Hunchback of Notre Dame II, in which she also voiced the character Madellaine. She later contributed a song to the 2004 television film A Christmas Carol, an adaptation of the original novella by Charles Dickens; she also played a lead role in the film. Since 2004, Hewitt has shifted her attention to acting over music. In June 2006, the compilation album, Cool with You: The Platinum Collection, was released only in Asia as Hewitt's final record. She released five songs in 2013 in association with the television drama The Client List, in which she played the lead character. One of the tracks, "I'm a Woman", was promoted as a single with a music video. The same year, Hewitt collaborated with Sophie B. Hawkins on a song for the comedy film Alpha Males Experiment.

Albums

Studio albums

Compilation album

Singles

As lead artist

Promotional singles

Other appearances

Music videos

Notes

References

Citations

Book sources

External links
 
 

Discographies of American artists
Discography
Pop music discographies